Sanabi (English: The Grey Mare) is a 1995 Indian Meitei language film written by M. K. Binodini Devi and directed by Aribam Syam Sharma. The movie stars Haorongbam Deben and R.K. Sushila in the lead roles. It is jointly produced by Doordarshan and National Film Development Corporation (NFDC). The film won the National Film Award for Best Feature Film in Manipuri at the 43rd National Film Awards. Sanabi got selection at the International Film Festival of India, 1996 and Cairo International Film Festival, Egypt, 1996.

Sanabi in its original form was written as a short story by M. K. Binodini Devi under the title Sagol Sanabi. It was later made into a radio play named as Shriban Chinggi Tamnalai.

Synopsis
Mangi, irritated by his childhood friend Sakhi’s refusal to marry him, steals her beloved grey mare in order to force her to agree.

Cast
 Haorongbam Deben as Mangi
 R.K. Sushila as Sakhi
 Takhellambam Nabakumar as Birchandra, Sakhi's father
 Heisnam Ongbi Indu as Sakhi's mother
 Thokchom Ongbi Jamini
 Lourembam Pishak as Mangi's grandmother
 Gurumayum Tomba
 Y. Kumarjit
 Lala
 Wangkhem Lalitkumar (Cameo appearance)

Accolades
Sanabi won the National Film Award for Best Feature Film in Manipuri at the 43rd National Film Awards. The citation for the National Award reads, "For its apt and poetic handling of the conflict between the traditional and modern values, knitted around a pony symbolically".

References

External links
 

1995 films
Films directed by Aribam Syam Sharma
Meitei-language films
Meitei folklore in popular culture